Govedartsi is a village located in Samokov Municipality, Sofia Province and a ski resort in the Rila Mountains of Bulgaria. It is located 26 kilometres from Borovets and 80 kilometres from Sofia.  The  Cherny Iskar River flows in the area and the village is situated near Yonchevo Lake.

References
Bulgariaski.com

Ski areas and resorts in Bulgaria